Trouxemil e Torre de Vilela (officially União das Freguesias de Trouxemil e Torre de Vilela) is a civil parish in the municipality of Coimbra, Portugal. The population in 2011 was 3,954, in an area of 10.56 km2. It was formed on 28 January 2013 by the merging of freguesias Trouxemil and Torre de Vilela.

References 

Freguesias of Coimbra